Pyrgocorypha is a genus of coneheads in the family Tettigoniidae. There are about 16 described species in Pyrgocorypha, found in the Americas, southern and eastern Asia.

Species
These 16 species belong to the genus Pyrgocorypha:

 Pyrgocorypha annulatus (Karny, 1907) c g
 Pyrgocorypha formosana Matsumura, S. & Shiraki, 1908 c g
 Pyrgocorypha gracilis Liu, Xian-wei, 1997 c g
 Pyrgocorypha hamata (Scudder, S.H., 1878) c g
 Pyrgocorypha mutica Karny, 1907 c g
 Pyrgocorypha nigridens (Burmeister, H., 1838) c g
 Pyrgocorypha parva Liu, Xian-wei, 2012 c g
 Pyrgocorypha philippina Hebard, 1922 c g
 Pyrgocorypha planispina (Haan, 1843) c g
 Pyrgocorypha rogersi Saussure & Pictet, 1898 c g
 Pyrgocorypha sallei (Saussure, 1859) c g
 Pyrgocorypha shirakii Karny, 1907 c g
 Pyrgocorypha sikkimensis (Karny, 1907) c g
 Pyrgocorypha subulata (Thunberg, 1815) c g
 Pyrgocorypha uncinata (Harris, 1841) i c g b (hook-faced conehead)
 Pyrgocorypha velutina Redtenbacher, 1891 c g

Data sources: i = ITIS, c = Catalogue of Life, g = GBIF, b = Bugguide.net

References

Further reading

 

Conocephalinae
Articles created by Qbugbot